Verkhneye Soskovo is a rural locality in Kosteltsevsky Selsoviet Rural Settlement, Kurchatovsky District, Kursk Oblast, Russia. Population:

Geography 
The village is located 72 km from the Russia–Ukraine border, 35 km west of Kursk, 13 km north-east of the district center – the town Kurchatov, 11 km from the selsoviet center – Kosteltsevo.

 Climate
Verkhneye Soskovo has a warm-summer humid continental climate (Dfb in the Köppen climate classification).

Transport 
Verkhneye Soskovo is located 27 km from the federal route  Crimea Highway, 12 km from the road of regional importance  (Kursk – Lgov – Rylsk – border with Ukraine), 2 km from the road of intermunicipal significance  (Seym River – Mosolovo – Nizhneye Soskovo), 2.5 km from the road Kurchatov – Zhmakino – Checheviznya, 13.5 km from the nearest railway halt 433 km (railway line Lgov I — Kursk).

The rural locality is situated 40.5 km from Kursk Vostochny Airport, 139 km from Belgorod International Airport and 244 km from Voronezh Peter the Great Airport.

References

Notes

Sources

Rural localities in Kurchatovsky District, Kursk Oblast